Bendersky Uyezd (Бендерский уезд) was one of the subdivisions of the Bessarabia Governorate of the Russian Empire. It was situated in the southern part of the governorate. Its administrative centre was Bender.

Demographics
At the time of the Russian Empire Census of 1897, Bendersky Uyezd had a population of 194,915. Of these, 45.1% spoke Romanian, 14.1% Gagauz or Turkish, 10.8% Ukrainian, 9.5% Russian, 8.5% Yiddish, 7.6% Bulgarian, 2.9% German, 0.6% Polish, 0.4% Romani, 0.1% Greek, 0.1% Belarusian and 0.1% Armenian as their native language.

See also
Comrat Republic

References

 
Uezds of Bessarabia Governorate
Bessarabia Governorate